The notion of the Labor army (трудовая армия, трудармия) was introduced in Soviet Russia during the Russian Civil War in 1920. Initially the term was applied to regiments of Red Army transferred from military activity to labor activity, such as logging, coal mining, firewood stocking, etc.

History
The first labor army (1я Трудармия, 1-я армия труда) was created after the defeat of Kolchak on the base of the 3rd Army located in the Urals region by the initiative of the army commander  Mikhail Matiyasevich (командарм Михаил Степанович Матиясевич).

Leon Trotsky, acting as People's Commissar of Army and Fleet Affairs and Chairman of the Revolutionary Military Council of the Republic at this time, developed this idea further. He argued that the economic situation in the country required introduction of the universal labor duty. In the case of workers, this could be done with the help of trade unions, while in the case of peasantry, Trotsky argued, it was possible only through mobilization.

He argued further that "army-type organization is in fact inherently Soviet type of organization".

His critics argued that this idea was leading back to the times of tsarism and slavery. Trotsky retorted that unlike old times, workers were supposed to work not for exploiters, but for their own good, for their own state, i.e., labor duty is the fulfillment of the obligations of the liberated working class with respect to their "worker-peasant state" in the cases of emergency.

By the end of the Russian Civil War and the introduction of New Economic Policy  the idea of the labor army ended, especially after Joseph Stalin's assumption of power and the implementation of his policies of industrialization and collectivization, which effectively solved the problem of workforce mobilization both in industry and agriculture.

Nazi Germany
In Nazi Germany, the Reich Labour Service was established to help mitigate the effects of unemployment on the German economy, militarise the workforce and indoctrinate it with Nazi ideology. It was the official state labour service, divided into separate sections for men and women.

Later Soviet Union
During World War II certain categories of population, primarily ethnic Germans, were conscripted into NKVD labor columns, in later literature informally referred to as "labor army".

Until the last days of the Soviet Union, the Soviet Army incorporated the idea of the labor army. With obligatory military duty in the state, men deemed unfit for regular military duty but not unfit for other work, as well as many able-bodied ones, were assigned to construction battalions (стройбаты). This tradition continues in a number of post-Soviet states, notably Russia, Belarus and Turkmenistan.

See also
Alternative civilian service
Bevin Boys
Civil conscription
Civilian Conservation Corps
Construction soldier
Hand and hitch-up services
Labor battalion
Reserve Army of Labour
Reichsarbeitsdienst
Workfare
Unfree labour

References

Soviet internal politics
Forced migration in the Soviet Union
Unfree labor in the Soviet Union
Conscription
Military of the Soviet Union
Non-combatant military personnel